Chakraayudham is a 1978 Indian Malayalam film,  directed by R. Reghuvaran Nair and produced by Areefa Hassan. The film stars Sreemoolanagaram Vijayan, Sathar, Unnimary and Adoor Pankajam in the lead roles. The film has musical score by K. J. Joy.

Cast
Sreemoolanagaram Vijayan
Sathaar
Unnimary
Adoor Pankajam
Sathyapriya
Ushakumari
Vincent

Soundtrack
The music was composed by K. J. Joy and the lyrics were written by Mankombu Gopalakrishnan and Yusufali Kechery.

References

External links
 

1978 films
1970s Malayalam-language films